Blockchain-as-a-Service (BaaS) allows businesses to use cloud-based solutions to build, host and use their own blockchain apps, smart contracts and functions on the blockchain infrastructure developed by a vendor.  Just like the growing trend of using Software-as-a-service (SaaS) where access to the software is provided on a subscription basis, BaaS provides a business with access to a blockchain network of its desired configuration without the business having to develop their own Blockchain and build in-house expertise on the subject.

Many major cloud services providers now provide Blockchain-as-a-Service, including IBM, SalesForce, Microsoft, Amazon, Alibaba, Oracle and Baidu to name a few.

References

As a service
Cloud applications
Software delivery methods
Software distribution
Software industry
Blockchains